Dufferin County is a county and census division located in Central Ontario, Canada. The county seat is Orangeville, and the current Warden is Wade Mills. The current chief administrative officer is Sonya Pritchard.

History
It was originally organized as the "Provisional County of Dufferin", with preparatory work authorized by the Legislative Assembly of Ontario in 1875 and the actual formation taking effect in 1881, being created from parts of the counties of Grey and Simcoe, on the north and east, and from the County of Wellington on the south and west.

The Village of Grand Valley was erected from East Luther in 1897, and the two municipalities amalgamated in 1995 to form the Township of East Luther Grand Valley, which was erected into the Town of Grand Valley in 2012.

The county gets its name from Frederick Hamilton-Temple-Blackwood, 1st Marquess of Dufferin and Ava, who was Governor General of Canada between 1872-1878. Originally an agriculturally based economy, Dufferin's economy has diversified to include commercial and retail businesses, industries related to residential and commercial construction (building, supplies, aggregates, real estate) and manufacturing. A portion of Dufferin’s economy still depends on agriculture but tourism is becoming more important as the county takes a more positive role in attracting visitors.

Geography
Dufferin County is the highest plateau immediately south of Georgian Bay, and as such forms the watershed between the four lakes: Huron, Erie, Ontario and Simcoe. Four rivers — Saugeen, Grand, Credit and Nottawasaga — take their rise in Dufferin or in adjacent townships and drain through the county.

A continuation of the Caledon Mountains skirts the eastern side of the county. The highest peaks, however, are no match for the Blue Mountains north of Dufferin or the Caledon Mountains on the south.

The County of Dufferin, sits on the fringe of the Greater Toronto Area, about 100 kilometres northwest of Toronto.  It is largely a rural county with three urban settlement areas, namely Grand Valley, Orangeville and Shelburne. The Town of Orangeville, the county seat, is situated on the southern border of the county and is the largest urban centre, with just over half the population. Although Orangeville dominates in terms of population, in area it is very small and geographically compact.

Climate

Demographics

Education

Upper Grand District School Board operates secular Anglophone public schools. The Dufferin-Peel Catholic District School Board operates Anglophone Catholic public schools. The Conseil scolaire Viamonde operates secular Francophone schools serving the area. The Conseil scolaire de district catholique Centre-Sud (CSDCCS) operates Catholic Francophone schools serving the area.

Travel region

Dufferin County is part of two Ontario travel regions. Headwaters Tourism Association represents the county and the adjacent municipalities of Caledon and Erin. Central Counties of Ontario combines the Headwaters area and a larger adjacent region.

See also

 List of municipalities in Ontario
 List of Ontario Census Divisions
 List of townships in Ontario
 Southern Ontario

Notes

References

External links

 
Counties in Ontario